The 38th CARIFTA Games was held in the George Odlum National Stadium in Vieux Fort, Saint Lucia, on April 10–13, 2009.    Detailed
reports on the results were given.

Participation (unofficial)

Detailed result lists can be found on the CFPI Timing website, and on the "World Junior Athletics History"
website. An unofficial count yields the number of about 545
athletes (junior (under-20) and youth (under-17)) from about 25 countries:
Anguilla (5), Antigua and Barbuda (7), Aruba (14), Bahamas (58), Barbados
(45), Bermuda (23), British Virgin Islands (6), Cayman Islands (12), Dominica
(7), French Guiana (7), Grenada (21), Guadeloupe (19), Guyana (10), Haiti (9),
Jamaica (68), Martinique (37), Montserrat (4), Netherlands Antilles (22),
Saint Kitts and Nevis (30), Saint Lucia (42), Saint Vincent and the Grenadines
(6), Suriname (2), Turks and Caicos (14), Trinidad and Tobago (64), US Virgin
Islands (13).

Records

A total of 15 new games records were set.

In the boys' U-20 category, there were 6 new records set, the most significant
by Kirani James of Grenada finishing the 400 metres in 
45.45 seconds, thereby gathering this
years' Austin Sealy Award.  
The new mark for 1500 metres was set by Gavyn Nero from Trinidad and
Tobago in 3:47.56, and for 5000 metres
by Jamaican Kemoy Campbell in 14:40.67. 
Jehue Gordon from Trinidad and Tobago won the 400 m hurdles in the new
record time of 50.01 seconds.
On the field, Raymond Higgs from the Bahamas cleared 2.21m in high 
jump, whereas Quincy Wilson from
Trinidad and Tobago threw the discus  55.67 metres.

The new games record in the girls' U-20 category was set by Natoya Goule
of Jamaica running the 1500 metres in 4:27.48.

In the boys' U-17 category, Jahazeel Murphy of Jamaica set two new games
records, one in the 200 metres in 20.97s (1.4 m/s),  and the other by leading
the Jamaican 4 × 100 m relay team to 40.76s.

The U-17 girls set also 6 new records:  Jamaica's Shericka Jackson 
set the new record mark for 400 metres to 53.48s, and helped both relay teams to
establish new records, 45.05s for 4 × 100 m, and 3:38:09 for 4 × 400 m. 
Her compatriot Janieve Russell was also member of both record relay teams,
and moreover set the record for 300 metres hurdles to 41.30s. 
In high jump, both Peta-Gaye Reid of Jamaica and Akela Jones of
Barbados cleared 1.80m equaling the games record set in
1999.   
Finally, the new triple jump record was set to 12.61m by Jamaica’s Rochelle Farquharson.

Austin Sealy Award

The Austin Sealy Trophy for the
most outstanding athlete of the games was awarded to Kirani James of
Grenada.   He won the gold medal in the 400 metres
competition in the
junior (U-20) category setting the new games record to 45.45s,
improving Usain Bolt's record from the year 2003, and a bronze medal with
the 4 × 400 m relay team from Grenada.

Medal summary
 
Complete results can be found on the CFPI Timing website and on the World Junior Athletics History
website.

Boys under 20 (Junior)

: Open event for both junior and youth athletes.

Girls under 20 (Junior)

: Open event for both junior and youth athletes.

Boys under 17 (Youth)

Girls under 17 (Youth)

Medal table

References

External links
World Junior Athletics History

CARIFTA Games
Car
CARIFTA
2009 in Caribbean sport
International sports competitions hosted by Saint Lucia
Athletics competitions in Saint Lucia